Luke Fleet Lester from the University of New Mexico, Albuquerque, NM was named Fellow of the Institute of Electrical and Electronics Engineers (IEEE) in 2013 for contributions to quantum dot lasers.

References

Fellow Members of the IEEE
Living people
Year of birth missing (living people)
Place of birth missing (living people)
University of New Mexico faculty
American electrical engineers